Amphelissoeme is a genus of beetles in the family Cerambycidae, containing a single species, Amphelissoeme viridescens.

References

Xystrocerini
Monotypic Cerambycidae genera